Roger Love is an American vocal coach based in Los Angeles who has worked with many singers, actors and public speakers.

Career 
Love took his first singing lessons when he was 13 years old.
By 16 or 17 he studied vocal pedagogy in Seth Riggs's studio. He became a junior partner in the studio but soon founded his own studio and took some of Riggs's clients. He was initially interested in a career in opera, but developed a passion for working with pop musicians after coaching The Beach Boys, Chicago, and The 5th Dimension. Today he owns Voice Place Inc.

Love is notable for working with Gwen Stefani, Selena Gomez, John Mayer, and Eminem.

Love has worked as a vocal consultant on major Hollywood films including A Star Is Born (2018), Crazy Heart, Southland Tales, Walk the Line, and Begin Again; coaching actors such as Keira Knightley, Reese Witherspoon, Joaquin Phoenix, and Bradley Cooper. Many of them have won Grammy Award, Screen Actors Guild Awards, and Academy Awards after working with Love.

Love has been a featured cast member on TV shows such as Popstars (WB), Rock Star INXS (CBS), Sing Your Face Off (ABC) and ENCORE (Disney+).

Love has also developed a method for increasing clarity and confidence when speaking, and has coached executives and personalities including Tony Robbins and Tyra Banks.

Method 
Love’s vocal method focuses on diaphragmatic breathing, daily vocal exercises, and bridging the head voice and chest voice via the “middle voice”. Love analyzes his clients’ voices by asking them to sing a musical scale that includes very low and very high notes.

Personal life 
Love was born around 1969-1970 in Los Angeles in a Jewish working-class family. He started singing in a Synagogue Temple Beth Am guided by the Cantor Allan Michelson. Later he worked and a fill-in cantor at Burbank Temple Emanu El. Love is married to Miyoko Love and has two children Madison Emiko Love, a Japanese-American songwriter and vocalist, and Colin Makoto Love. Love lives in Los Angeles and owns a dog, Gigi.

Love has been featured in the Los Angeles Times and HuffPost, and on Larry King Now,  Rachael Ray and Nightline.

Bibliography

Discography

Filmography

References

External links 
 
 Official website

Living people
American vocal coaches
American Jews
Vocal coaches
Voice teachers
People from Los Angeles
Writers from Los Angeles
American writers
21st-century American writers
Year of birth missing (living people)